Radio 6 may refer to:

BBC Radio 6 Music, a BBC Radio station
NPO Radio 6, a Dutch radio station
Radio Six International, online radio, Glasgow, Scotland